Leucocoprinus cepistipes (often spelled cepaestipes), is a species of fungus in the family Agaricaceae. It is typically found on wood debris, such as wood chips but may also grow in potted plants or greenhouses. Typical characteristics include a fine-scaled bell-shaped cap, a partial veil, and a tendency to bruise a yellow to brown when handled.

The species is edible, but not very palatable.

Taxonomy 
It was first described in 1796 by the English naturalist James Sowerby who classified it as Agaricus cepistipes or cepaestipes'. Sowerby's observations of this species were made in bark beds around London where he described its presence as 'not uncommon'. Leucocoprinus species are not native to England but were introduced to greenhouses when tropical plants were brought back by explorers. Sowerby thought that Bulliard's Leucocoprinus cretaceus was the same species since white Leucocoprinus species can look very similar, especially when comparing only illustrations and descriptions in text. However he also considered that the yellow Leucocoprinus birnbaumii, then known as Agaricus luteus was 'undoubtedly the same species', only differing in colour. So whilst his illustration is intricately drawn and coloured it rather confusingly has the yellow and white species side by side.

Sowerby doesn't explicitly state that the observations were made in greenhouses however he does note that the yellow mushrooms were observed at Sir Abraham Hume's Wormleybury manor. During this period exotic plants from the East Indies and India were being cultivated in greenhouses and stove-heated hothouses at Wormleybury making it likely that this is where the mushrooms were found. This may give an indication as to where the fungi observed originated from.

English botanist William Withering disagreed with Sowerby's assumption that all three species were the same and thought that A. cepaestipes and A. cretaceus were the same species but that A. Luteus must be different.

In 1821 the British botanist and mycologist Samuel Frederick Gray classified the species as Coprinus cepaestipes in his book titled A Natural Arrangement of British Plants'. Gray suggested the common name of 'onion-stalked dung-stool'. However his description was again conflating this species with L. birnbaumii and referred to the mushroom as entirely yellow. Leucocoprinus cretaceus, then known as Agaricus cretaceus was simply described as entirely white. The confusion between these species is seen again in 1843 when Miles Joseph Berkeley described an observation of Agaricus (Lepiota) cepaestipes from Oeiras, Piauhy, Brazil in which the specimens are described as sulphur yellow. Berkeley described it as very closely resembling Jens Wilken Hornemann's illustration of Agaricus cepaestipes from Flora Danica however this illustration is without colour and the accompanying description only mentions pale gills. Berkeley may have actually been observing Leucocoprinus birnbaumii or other yellow species found in Brazil such as Leucocoprinus brunneoluteus.In 1871 the German botanist Otto Kuntze classified the species as Lepiota cepaestipes in his book titled 'Der Führer in die Pilzkunde or 'The Guide to Mycology'. Kuntze appears to have been correctly describing L. cretaceus as he noted that the specimen had a white cap and stem with a hollow stem ring which quickly disappeared. He stated that the mushrooms grew in large numbers in gardens and greenhouses but not too often. He described the base of the mushroom as 'Zwiebelfuß' or 'onion-footed' referring to the bulbous base which is common amongst Leucocoprinus species.

In the same year the British mycologists Miles Joseph Berkeley & Christopher Edmund Broome wrote of L. cepaestipes specimens found amongst decayed herbs. They were described as 'densely clustered, of a beautiful yellow, base of stipes tinged with orange. They also commented about these mushrooms being the same as ones found occasionally in their hothouses.

Over the centuries it has been classified numerous times or merged with other classified observations which were found to be the same species so this mushroom has many synonyms but few which are ever used today.

In 1889 it was reclassified as Leucocoprinus cepistipes by the French mycologist Narcisse Théophile Patouillard. The specimens studied were collected in March and April 1889 from the Caribbean island of Martinique having been found on an old rotten coconut tree trunk.

In 1883 the English botanist and mycologist Mordecai Cubitt Cooke produced illustrations of Agaricus (Lepiota) cepaestipes in his book entitled 'Illustrations of British Fungi. The mushrooms were described as growing in greenhouses. Cooke likewise appeared to conflate numerous species with side by side drawings of both yellow and white species considered as one.

 Description 
Leucocoprinus cepistipes is a small dapperling mushroom with white flesh.Cap: 3–9 cm. Bulbous when immature becoming convex with a pronounced umbo which may be darker in the centre against the white colour of the rest of the cap. Stem: 6–9 cm in height. 4-10mm thick. Slightly bulbous at the base with a stem ring which may quickly disappear. May discolour slightly yellow or pinkish brown. Gills: White, sometimes discolouring to pinkish brown with age. Free and crowded. Spore print: White. Spores: Ellipsoid and smooth with a tiny pore. Dextrinoid.7-11 x 4-7 μm. Smell:''' Indistinct.

 Habitat and Distribution 
This species has commonly been described from greenhouses and hothouses and is especially noted for growing in bark beds. In 1867 the Belgian botanist Jean Kickx documented Agaricus cepaestipes growing in tanbark in the greenhouses of the Ghent Botanical garden during the Summer.

 Etymology 
The specific epithet cepistipes (originally cepaestipes) is derived from the Latin cepae meaning onions whilst stipes means stalk or stem so 'onion stem'. This is a reference to the bulbous base of Leucocoprinus'' species which may look reminiscent to the bulb of a small onion.

References

External links
 California Fungi: Leucocoprinus cepaestipes

Fungi described in 1797
Fungi of Europe
Fungi of North America
Taxa named by James Sowerby
Leucocoprinus